Andre Berto vs. Victor Ortiz was a welterweight world title fight that aired on HBO's World Championship Boxing on April 16, 2011. As part of an HBO televised broadcast, the split-site double-header included WBA junior welterweight Championship Amir Khan vs. Paul McCloskey, Khan fighting from his native England.

Build Up
Berto came off a TKO victory over Freddy Hernandez. Berto successfully defended his WBC welterweight title, stopping Hernandez at 2:07 of the first round. He hammered Hernandez (29-2) with a left hook, then floored him with a straight right during the co-feature fight of the Juan Manuel Marquez-Michael Katsidis lightweight championship bout.

While Ortiz's last battle ended up being a draw against Lamont Peterson that could have delay that desire on the Amir Khan-Marcos Maidana junior welterweight title fight undercard.  Peterson went down for the first time from a right hand that finished a four-punch combination. Peterson got up quickly and did not appear hurt. But he was moments later from another punch and he grabbed on to Ortiz as they tumbled to the mat.
Both Andre Berto and Victor Ortiz were considered by some as two of the hottest prospects in any division.

Both rapper 50 Cent and #2 P4P boxer in the world Floyd Mayweather Jr. were sitting in ring side.

Negotiations
The fight was sanctioned as a world title fight in the welterweight division, where the weight limit is 147 pounds.  However, Berto's camp agreed to fight at a catchweight of "145 pounds plus one" to accommodate Ortiz, who was moving up from the 140 lb division.

The fight
Although Ortiz was the fighter moving up in weight, on fight night he was 161 on HBO's unofficial scale while Berto was 156. At Friday's weigh in, Ortiz weighed in at the contracted catchweight of 146 pounds, while Berto weighed 145.5.
Ortiz outpointed Andre Berto to take Berto’s welterweight title.

Ortiz took the fight to Berto (27-1, 21 KOs) from the beginning and almost never let up. Berto fired back throughout the fight but wasn't able to fully cope with the challenger’s relentless pressure and hard, accurate punches. The knockdowns started almost immediately, Ortiz sending Berto down to one knee—and hurting him—with a combination in the first round. Berto returned the favor in the second with a right to the chin, forcing Ortiz to touch the canvas with his glove. Ortiz won the next three rounds by continuing to fire punches, many of which landed. Again, Berto punched back but couldn’t keep pace. In the sixth round, Ortiz dropped his left hand and Berto landed a huge right about two minutes into the round, putting Ortiz on his back. Ortiz survived and put Berto down with a short left with a few seconds remaining in the round. Ortiz controlled the remainder of the fight as he had most of the first six rounds, pounding Berto inside with hard shots to the body and head as Berto failed to keep up.

On April, 2016, the pair had a rematch, with Berto reversing his loss to Ortiz by way of a fourth-round technical knockout win.

Undercard

Televised
Welterweight Championship bout: Andre Berto vs.  Victor Ortiz
Ortiz defeated Berto by unanimous decision.(115-110, 114-112, 114-111)
Light Middleweight bout: Deandre Latimore vs.  Dennis Sharpe
Latimore defeated Sharpe by unanimous decision.(80-72, 80-72, 80-72)

Preliminary card
Welterweight bout: Joseph Elegele vs.  Angel Hernandez
Elegele defeated Hernandez by TKO of round 2.
Welterweight bout: Thomas Dulorme vs.  Harrison Cuello
Dulorme defeated Cuello by KO at 1:27 of round 2.
Middleweight bout: J'Leon Love vs.  JC Peterson
Love defeated Peterson by TKO of round 2.
Bantamweight bout: Luis Rosa vs.  Joseliz Cepeda
Rosa defeated Cepeda by TKO at 1:12 of round 5.
Heavyweight bout: Sonya Lamonakis vs.  Gigi Jackson
Lamonakis defeated Jackson by points.

References

External links
 
HBO

Boxing matches
2011 in boxing
Boxing in Connecticut
Sports in Ledyard, Connecticut
2011 in sports in Connecticut
Boxing on HBO
Golden Boy Promotions
April 2011 sports events in the United States